This is a list of notable past and present residents of the U.S. city of Phoenix, Arizona, and its surrounding metropolitan area.  For people whose only connection with the city is attending the nearby Arizona State University, see: List of Arizona State University alumni.

Arts

 Marcus Amerman – Native American artist
 Kevin Caron – sculptor
 Spencer Herr (born 1974) – artist.
 Thomas Kuntz – artist
 Linda Lomahaftewa – Native American artist
 Betsy Schneider – photographer
 Gage Skidmore – photographer
 Gary Tillery – artist
 Hulleah Tsinhnahjinnie – photographer
 John Henry Waddell – sculptor

Athletics

 Jeremy Accardo – professional baseball pitcher
 Alvan Adams – professional basketball player
 Jeremy Affeldt – professional baseball pitcher
 Jim Ahern – professional golfer
 Mark Alarie – professional basketball player
 Charlotte Armstrong – professional baseball player
 Bobby Ball – racecar driver
 Phil Barkdoll – NASCAR owner-driver
 Charles Barkley – professional basketball player, TV commentator
 Jerryd Bayless – professional basketball player
 Rod Beck – professional baseball pitcher
 Rich Beem – professional golfer
 Mike Bell – professional football player
 Steve Belles – professional football player
 Mike Bibby – professional basketball player
 Amanda Blumenherst – professional golfer
 Billy Boat – professional racecar driver
 Chad Boat – professional racecar driver
 Dallas Braden – professional baseball pitcher, pitched perfect game in 2010
 Richie Brockel – professional football player
 Brian Broderick – professional baseball pitcher
 Jim Brown – professional hockey player
 Travis Brown – professional football player
 Marcus Brunson – professional sprinter
 Jimmy Bryan – professional racecar driver
 Sean Burke – professional hockey player
 Cory Burns – professional baseball pitcher
 Dan Butler – professional baseball player
 Jimmy Button – professional motocross racer
 Yori Boy Campas – world-champion boxer
 Trung Canidate – professional football player
 Michael Carbajal – professional boxer
 Jade Carey – artistic gymnast
 Fred Carr – professional football player
 Henry Cejudo – Olympic gold medalist in freestyle wrestling; MMA fighter
 Tom Chambers – professional basketball player
 Brandel Chamblee – professional golfer
 Eddie Cheever – professional racecar driver
 Matt Clapp – professional football player
 Dennis Claridge – professional football player
 Cameron Clark – professional basketball player
 Will Claye – Olympic track medalist
 Jerry Colangelo – founder of Phoenix Suns and Arizona Diamondbacks
 Steve Colter – professional basketball player
 Ty Conklin – professional hockey player
 Chris Cook – professional racecar driver
 Mike Cosgrove – professional baseball pitcher
 Sean Couturier – professional hockey player
 Jane Crafter – professional golfer
 Pauline Crawley – professional baseball player
 C. J. Cron – professional baseball player
 Kevin Cron – professional baseball player
 Mike Cunning – professional golfer
 Danny Curzon – pair figure skater
 Walter Davis – professional basketball player
 Jaff Decker – professional baseball player
 Andre Ethier – professional baseball player
 Heather Farr – professional golfer
 Jeff Feagles – professional football player
 Nick Firestone – professional racecar driver
 Cotton Fitzsimmons – former coach of the Phoenix Suns
 George Follmer – professional racecar driver
 Brandon Frazier – professional pairs skater
 Gabe Freeman – professional basketball player
 Channing Frye – professional basketball player
 Joe Garagiola – professional baseball player and sportscaster
 Scott Garlick – professional soccer player
 Gary Gentry – professional baseball player
 Jesús González – world champion and Olympic boxer
 Luis Gonzalez – professional baseball player
 David Gossett – professional golfer
 Wayne Gretzky – NHL legend
 Habe Haberling – professional racecar driver
 Gary Hall Jr. – Olympic gold medalist, swimmer
 Connie Hawkins – professional basketball player
 Solly Hemus – professional baseball player
 Manny Hendrix – professional football player
 Pat Hennen – Grand Prix motorcycle racer
 Charlie Hickcox – Olympic gold medal swimmer
 Jeff Hornacek – professional basketball player, coach for the Phoenix Suns
 Bob Howry – professional baseball pitcher
 Floyd Hudlow – professional football player
 Misty Hyman  – Olympic gold medal winner in swimming
 Kevin Jackson – Olympic gold medalist in freestyle wrestling, MMA fighter
 Reggie Jackson – pro baseball player, Hall of Fame
 Drisan James – professional football player
 Robert James – professional football player
 J. J. Jansen – professional football player
 Richard Jefferson – professional basketball player
 Brian Johnson – professional football player
 Kevin Johnson – professional basketball player, mayor of Sacramento, California
 Randy Johnson – professional baseball player, Hall of Fame
 Steve Jordan – professional football player
 Tommy Joseph – professional baseball player
 Todd Kalis – professional football player
 Anthony Kang – professional golfer
 Mark Kastelic – professional ice hockey player
 Klete Keller – Olympic gold medal winner in swimming
 Devon Kennard – professional football player
 Cristie Kerr – professional golfer
 Scott Kingery – Major League Baseball player
 Kyle Kosier – professional football player
 Keaton Kristick – professional football player
 Lerrin LaGrow – professional baseball player
 Darren Law – professional racecar driver
 Jason P. Lester – Ultra Endurance Athlete, Author and ESPY Award Winner
 Hank Leiber – professional baseball pitcher
 Jean Claude Leuyer – professional world champion kickboxer
 Jon Levine – tennis player
 Leta Lindley – professional golfer
 Broc Little – professional hockey player
 Kevin Long – professional baseball coach
 Dan Majerle – professional basketball player
 Derek Mason – college football coach
 Doug Mathis – professional baseball player
 Bethanie Mattek-Sands – professional tennis player
 Auston Matthews – professional ice hockey player
 Billy Mayfair – professional golfer
 Damon Mays – professional football player
 Randall McDaniel – Hall of Fame football player
 Shaun McDonald – professional football player
 Phil Mickelson – professional golfer
 Scott Miller – professional football player
 Zach Miller – professional football player
 Michele Mitchell – Olympic medal winner in swimming
 Georganne Moline – Olympic track athlete
 Marty Moore – professional football player
 John Moraga – professional mixed martial artist
 Arturo Moreno – billionaire and owner of the Anaheim Angels
 Carolyn Morris – professional baseball player
 Darryl Morrison – professional football player
 Trent Murphy– outside linebacker in the National Football League; played for the Washington Redskins and Buffalo Bills
 Carl Mulleneaux – professional football player
 Lee Mulleneaux – professional football player
 Ty Murray – professional bull rider, member of Pro Rodeo Hall of Fame
 Don Nicholas – professional baseball player
 Gerry Norquist – professional golfer
 Isaiah Oliver – cornerback for the Atlanta Falcons
 Danica Patrick – Indy Racing League and NASCAR driver
 Jeff Paulk – professional football player
 Jaime Perez – Outstanding Young Man of Phoenix 2019
 Pat Perez – professional golfer
 Adam Pettyjohn – professional baseball player
 Steve Phoenix – professional baseball player
 Damon Pieri – professional football player
 Don Pooley – professional golfer
 Jason Pridie – professional baseball player
 Joe Proski – professional basketball athletic trainer
 Ted Purdy – professional golfer
 Marilyn Ramenofsky – Olympic medalist in swimming
 Richey Reneberg – professional tennis player
 Buddy Rice – Indy Racing League
 Kay Rohrer – professional baseball player
 Ahmed Santos – professional boxer
 Danny Schayes – college and NBA basketball player, son of Dolph Schayes
 Curt Schilling – professional baseball player
 Kevin Scott – professional football player
 Jason Shivers – professional football player
 Sara Slattery – long-distance runner, NCAA champion
 Shelley Smith – professional football player
 Eric Sogard – professional baseball player
 Phillippi Sparks – professional football player
 Brad Steinke – Emmy award-winning sportscaster
 Jane Stoll – professional baseball player
 Nick Sundberg – professional football player
 Shawn Swayda – professional football player
 John Tait – professional football player
 Kevin Thomas – professional football player
 Marcus Thomas – professional football player
 Bernard Thompson – professional basketball player
 Tage Thompson - professional ice hockey player
 Pat Tillman – professional football player and Afghanistan War casualty
 Cole Tucker – professional baseball player
 Howard Twitty – professional golfer
 Dick Van Arsdale – professional basketball player
 Jamie Varner – professional boxer, WEC lightweight champion
 Damian Vaughn – professional football player
 Max Venable – professional baseball player
 Bobby Wade – professional football player
 Neal Walk – basketball player
 Lora Webster – Para-Olympic volleyball player
 Wayne Weiler – professional racecar driver
 Paul Westphal – professional basketball player
 Kenny Wheaton – professional football player
 Mark Whipple – professional football player, college football coach
 Danny White – professional football player
 Dot Wilkinson – Hall of Fame for bowling and softball
 Patsy Willard – Olympic medalist in diving
 Larry Willis – professional football player
 Cheyenne Woods – professional golfer (niece of Tiger Woods)
 Darren Woodson – professional football player
 Terry Wright – professional football player
 Toby Wright – professional football player
 J. J. Yeley – professional racecar driver
 Win Young – Olympic medalist in diving

Business

 Eddie Basha Jr. – businessman, CEO of Bashas'
 Mark Bingham – entrepreneur, passenger on United Airlines Flight 93
 Dwight B. Heard – publisher, co-founder of the Heard Museum
 Jim Hensley – founder of Hensley & Co.
 Charles H. Keating Jr. – businessman
 Tom Leppert – businessman, CEO of Kaplan, Inc.
 Eddie Matney – restaurateur
 Cindy McCain – businesswoman, chairwoman of Hensley & Co.
 Bob Parsons – entrepreneur, founder of GoDaddy
 Jeffrey Peterson – entrepreneur, found of Quepasa
 Simon Rohrich – inventor and entrepreneur
 Karsten Solheim – businessman, founder of Karsten Manufacturing, maker of PING golf clubs
 John Sperling – businessman, founder of University of Phoenix
 Edward A. Tovrea – entrepreneur
 Del Webb – real estate developer
 Paul Elio – CEO of Elio Motors

Literature

 Sally Ball – poet
 Erma Bombeck – columnist and advice author
 Alexandra Bracken – author
 Amanda Brown – author, Legally Blonde
 Jaime Clarke – writer
 Linda Cobb – columnist, "Queen of Clean"
 Michael Collier – poet
 Clive Cussler – adventure novelist
 Boyé Lafayette De Mente – author, journalist
 Maureen Dragone – journalist, author
 Stella Pope Duarte – author
 Peter Ferrara – columnist
 Terri Fields – "Reading is Sweet" program
 Diana Gabaldon – author, creator of the Outlander series
 Shanna Hogan – journalist and author
 Flora Jessop – author, social activist
 Chalmers Johnson – author
 Bil Keane – cartoonist
 Clarence Budington Kelland – author
 Whitney Keyes – author
 Robert Kiyosaki – businessman, investor, and author; best known for the Rich Dad Poor Dad series
 Gini Koch – science fiction author
 Elizabeth Kübler-Ross – psychiatrist
 Meghan McCain – author, columnist
 Todd McFarlane – comic book author and art director
 Lisa McMann – author
 Carlton Mellick III – author
 Stephenie Meyer – teen literature novelist
 Lisa Olson – sports journalist
 Barbara Park – children's author
 Howard Rheingold – author
 Rhondi A. Vilott Salsitz – author
 Mary Schmich – Pulitzer Prize-winning author
 Gianna Talone – author
 Marshall Terrill – author, journalist
 Gary Tillery – author
 Lew Welch – poet

Movies/television/media

 Jaime Lyn Bauer – actress
 Nellie Bellflower – actress
 The Boogeyman (Martin Wright) – professional wrestler
 Charles Boyer – actor
 Sally Brophy – actress
 Aidy Bryant – comedian, actress
 Travis Caldwell – actor
 Lynda Carter – singer and actress, title role on Wonder Woman
 Joan Ganz Cooney – producer, founder of Children's Television Workshop
 Evelyn Dall – actress, singer
 Matt Dallas – actor
 Amy Davidson – actress
 Kaitlyn Dever – actress
 Kirby Dick –  film director, producer, screenwriter
 Dennis Farina – actor, Law & Order
 Maritza Lizeth Gallego Félix – television journalist
 Jennie Garth – actress
 Kimiko Glenn – actress
 Hunter Gomez – actor
 Clay Graham – TV writer, producer
 Loretta King Hadler – actress
 Sammi Hanratty – actress
 Alexa Havins – actress, All My Children
 Amelia Heinle – actress
 David Henrie – actor
 Gregg Hoffman – producer, created Saw franchise
 Daniel Humbarger – stand-up comedian
 Jenna Jameson – adult film star
 Ben Johnson – champion rodeo rider and Oscar-winning actor
 Chelsea Kane – actress
 Dianne Kay – actress
 Judy Kaye – actress, singer
 Ruth Maleczech – avant-garde actress
 Josh McDermitt – actor and comedian
 Karen McDougal – model, Playboy Playmate of the Year 1998
 Jenny Mollen – actress
 Sylvia Morales – film director, producer, screenwriter
 Frankie Muniz – actor
 Leslie Nielsen – actor, Airplane!, The Naked Gun series
 April O'Neil – porn star
 Tarah Paige – actress and gymnast
 Greg Proops – actor and comedian
 Robert Wayne Rainey – director/photographer, and artistic community activist
 Rachel Ramras – actress, voice actress, TV writer
 Naibe Reynoso – Emmy Award-winning reporter, actress, The Practice
 Haley Lu Richardson – actress
 Ashley Roberts – actress and singer
 Jennifer Rubin – actress, model 
 Jackson Robert Scott - actor
 Robert Simonds – film producer
 David Spade – actor, Saturday Night Live, Tommy Boy
 Fay Spain – actress
 Steven Spielberg – Oscar-winning film director
 Emma Stone – actress
 Lizz Tayler – adult film star
 Amber Valletta – actress
 Dick Van Dyke – actor, The Dick Van Dyke Show, Mary Poppins
 Mare Winningham – actress
 Dean Winters – actor
 Shannon Woodward – actress

Music

 Michael Abels – composer
 Jim Adkins – musician, part of the band from Mesa, Jimmy Eat World
 Courtney Marie Andrews – singer/songwriter
 Geno Arce – musician/bass player
 Audrey Assad – Christian singer-songwriter
 Authority Zero – rock band
 Alec Benjamin – singer-songwriter
 Chester Bennington – musician/singer
 George Benson – musician
 Dierks Bentley – singer
 Derrick Bostrom – musician, member of Meat Puppets
 Cait Brennan – singer-songwriter
 Glen Campbell – singer
 Igor Cavalera – musician/drummer
 Max Cavalera – musician/singer
 Zyon Cavalera – musician/drummer
 Roger Clyne – singer-songwriter
 Jessi Colter – country musician
 Bruce Connole – singer-songwriter, founding member of The Jetzons
 Alice Cooper – musician
 Joey DeFrancesco – jazz musician
 DMX – rapper
 Duane Eddy – singer, Rock and Roll Hall of Fame
 Dolan Ellis – musician, official balladeer of Arizona
 Esteban – guitarist
 Frank Fafara – musician
 Sherry Finzer – classical flautist
 Dom Flemons – multi-instrumentalist, singer/songwriter
 Jeff Freundlich – songwriter, music producer
 Steve Gadd – musician, drummer
 Adelina Garcia – bolero singer
 Steve George – musician, member of Mr. Mister
 Gin Blossoms – rock band
 Rob Halford – heavy metal singer
 J. Michael Harter – country musician
 Julius Hegyi – conductor, violinist
 Marcos Hernandez – singer
 Bob Hoag – musician
 Jared & The Mill – rock band
 Scott Jeffers Traveler – composer, musician
 Waylon Jennings – singer, Country Music Hall of Fame
 Zola Jesus – singer-songwriter
 Dan Johnson – musician/drummer
 William Joseph – pianist, composer
 Tim Kelleher – musician
 Brandon Kellum – musician, frontman, member of American Standards
 Kerry King – guitarist, member of Slayer
 Cris Kirkwood – musician, bassist, member of Meat Puppets
 Kongos – rock band
 Steve Larson – musician
 Nils Lofgren – musician, songwriter
 Chelsey Louise – musician, member of Fairy Bones l
 George Lynch – guitarist/songwriter, member of Dokken
 Lois Maffeo – musician
 Peter Magadini – musician
 Mali Music (Kortney Jamaal Pollard) – singer/songwriter
 MC Magic (Marco Cardenas) – rapper, producer
 Mickey McGee – musician
 Mickey McMahan – big band musician, member of the Lawrence Welk orchestra
 Bret Michaels – singer-songwriter, musician, member of Poison
 Sam Moore – singer, member of the duo Sam & Dave
 Mr. Mister – rock band
 Dave Mustaine – musician, member of Metallica and Megadeth
 Lewis Nash – jazz drummer
 Paul Nelson – composer
 Jason Newsted – bassist, member of Metallica
 Wayne Newton – singer, "Mr. Las Vegas"
 Stevie Nicks – singer
 Willy Northpole (William Adams) – rapper
 Buck Owens – country singer
 Richard Page – musician, member of Mr. Mister
 CeCe Peniston – singer
 Jerry Riopelle – musician, record producer
 Marty Robbins – singer, Country Music Hall of Fame
 Howard Roberts – jazz musician
 Bob Shane – singer, member of The Kingston Trio
 Jordin Sparks – singer
 Sydney Sprague - singer/songwriter and multi-instrumentalist
 Chris Squire – musician, songwriter, member of Yes
 Melody Thornton – singer, Pussycat Dolls
 The Tubes – rock band
 Walkin' Cane Mark – blues musician
 Brian Welch – musician, member of Korn
 Vince Welnick – musician, member of the Grateful Dead
 Z-Trip – disc jockey

Politics

 John T. Alsap – first mayor of Phoenix
 Lela Alston – Arizona state senator and representative
 Joe Arpaio – former sheriff of Maricopa County
 Bruce Babbitt – former governor of Arizona and U.S. Interior Secretary
 Albert C. Baker – Arizona Supreme Court
 Nancy Barto – Arizona state senator and representative
 Betsey Bayless – Arizona Secretary of State
 Wesley Bolin – Arizona Governor and Secretary of State
 Paul Boyer – Arizona state representative
 Kate Brophy McGee – Arizona state representative
 Floyd I. Clarke – former FBI director
 Adam Perez Diaz – Phoenix City Councilman and Phoenix Vice-Mayor.
 Adam Driggs – Arizona state senator
 Kate Gallego - mayor of Phoenix since 2019
 Emil Ganz – early mayor of Phoenix
 Terry Goddard – mayor of Phoenix, Arizona Attorney General
 Barry Goldwater – former U.S. Senator and 1964 presidential candidate
 Barry Goldwater Jr. – U.S. House of Representatives
 Phil Gordon – mayor of Phoenix
 Margaret Hance – mayor of Phoenix
 Brad Hoylman – New York State Senator
 Paul Johnson – mayor of Phoenix
 Denison Kitchel – Phoenix attorney and national manager of the Goldwater presidential campaign
 G. Gordon Liddy – Watergate Scandal, chief operationist
 Samuel Mardian – mayor of Phoenix
 John McCain – U.S. Senator and 2000 and 2008 presidential candidate
 John McComish – Arizona state senator and representative
 Ernest McFarland – Arizona Governor; Senator from Arizona; Chief Justice, Arizona Supreme Court
 Robert Meza – Arizona state senator and representative
 Janet Napolitano – governor of Arizona and Secretary of Homeland Security
 John B. Nelson – mayor of Phoenix, Arizona House of Representatives, Arizona Senate
 Sandra Day O'Connor – U.S. Supreme Court Justice
 Wing F. Ong – Arizona state senator and representative
 Granville Henderson Oury – U.S. House of Representative (Arizona Territory)
 Ed Pastor – U.S. House of Representatives
 Mary Peters – U.S. Secretary of Transportation
 DeForest Porter – mayor of Phoenix; Justice, Arizona Territory Supreme Court
 Ben Quayle – former U.S. representative
 Dan Quayle – former U.S. Vice President
 William H. Rehnquist – Chief Justice, U.S. Supreme Court Justice
 Skip Rimsza – mayor of Phoenix
 Jack Roxburgh – Canadian politician and ice hockey administrator
 Carl Seel – member Arizona House of Representatives
 John Shadegg – former U.S. representative
 Stephen Shadegg – political consultant, public relations specialist, and author
 William P. Sims - Arizona state senator
 Richard Elihu Sloan – Arizona Territory Governor
 Greg Stanton – U.S. representative and mayor of Phoenix
 Bob Stump – U.S. House of Representatives
 Jesse Addison Udall – state legislator and chief justice of the Arizona Supreme Court
 John Hunt Udall – mayor of Phoenix, member of Arizona State Legislature
 Levi Stewart Udall – Chief Justice of Arizona Supreme Court
 Nick Udall – mayor of Phoenix
 Jack Williams – Governor of Arizona, Mayor of Phoenix
 Kimberly Yee – Arizona state treasurer

Science and Medicine
 Krystal Tsosie – geneticist and bioethicist known for promoting Indigenous data sovereignty and studying genetics within Indigenous communities

Miscellaneous

 Madison Anderson – beauty pageant titleholder, crowned Miss Universe Puerto Rico 2019
 Chris Bianco – American chef
 Allison DuBois – medium (the TV show Medium is based on her life)
 Diane Downs – American murderer who killed her daughter and attempted to murder her other children.
 Milton Erickson – psychiatrist
 Henry Garfias – Hispanic who became the first marshal of Phoenix, Arizona.
 Mark Goudeau (also known as the Baseline Killer) – serial killer, responsible for 9 deaths
 William Augustus Hancock – pioneer, one of the founders of Phoenix, first sheriff of Maricopa County
 Jack Swilling – commonly credited being the founder of the city of Phoenix, Arizona.
 Trinidad Swilling – known as "The Mother of Phoenix" was a Phoenix pioneer and the wife of Jack Swilling, the founder of Phoenix.
 Philip Edward Tovrea Jr. – U.S. Army Air Forces World War II ACE who was awarded the Silver Star Medal for gallantry and the Distinguished Flying Cross.
 William Wasson – founder of Nuestros Pequeños Hermanos.
 Frank Lloyd Wright – architect

References

List of notable residents
Phoenix, notable residents
Phoenix